Lapithos or Lapethos is a town in Cyprus. De facto, it is under the control of Northern Cyprus.

Archeologists claim that Lapithos was founded by the Achean brothers Praxandros and Cepheus.
According to Strabo, the ancient settlement of Lapathus, the site of which is nearby, was founded by Spartans.

In Assyrian inscriptions, Lapithos is mentioned as one of the eleven Cypriot kingdoms. During the Persian rule, Lapithos was settled by Phoenicians for a while. The last independent king Praxippos was subdued by Ptolemy I in 312 BC.

History

Pre-Roman

Strabo wrote that Lapethos is a 'construction of the Laconians and of Praxandros'. The philosopher Alexander of Ephesus called it "Imeroessa", meaning "attractive" and "passion-arousing".

Lapithos is usually referred in archaeological literature as a Laconian colony built after the Trojan War, by Praxandros, its first king. However, findings from excavations i.e. pots and pottery wheels date back its existence as early as 3000 BC. According to Diodoros of Sicily, who wrote in the 4th century BC, Lapithos was one of the nine kingdoms of Cyprus.

Peisistratos, king of Lapithos, with his flotilla, together with Nicocreon of Salamis and Stasanor of Curion, came to the aid of Alexander the Great, helping him to capture Tyre in Phoenicia. For this reason Alexander, the victorious army commander, declared Cyprus free from the Persians. The last king of Lapethos was Praxippos.

Roman, Byzantine and Lusignan periods

During the period of the Roman Empire, Lapethos had more than 10,000 inhabitants. It formed one of the four districts of Cyprus. From ancient times, Lapithos became a centre for the processing of copper and more importantly an earthenware centre.

During the proto-Christian period (25 BC – 250 AD) Lapethos experienced a great commercial drive because of the plethora of its produce, but also because of its port and its shipyard. During this period Lapethos was given the name Lambousa, "shining", maybe because of its shining wealth or because of its shining beauty and cleanliness or because of its lighthouse, which shed shining light to the surrounding region.

During the first years of Christianity the apostles Paul, Barnabas and Mark passed by Lapethos coming from Tarsus. According to Apostle Barnabas, Lapethos had city walls. He cites that during his second tour with Apostle Mark, they stayed outside the walls because they were not given access to the city. In late antiquity, Lapethos enjoyed great prosperity in commerce as well as in riches, art and development. Bishop of Lapithos Theodotos (c. 314–324) died a martyr in Kyrenia while Bishop Didymos was represented at the 4th Ecumenical Synod (451) by Saint Eulaleus or Eulampius, whose chapel can still be found near the Acheiropoietos Monastery.

Lapethos was heavily damaged during the Arab incursions. The population often had to flee and take refuge in the interior.

Upon the Byzantine recovery of Cyprus from the Arabs in 965, Lapithos's refugees returned to their town to rebuild it in a new location, but chose to stay away from the sea, relocating it to the foot of mountain Pentadactylos.

During the Lusignan period, Lapithos boasted a greater population than Limassol, Famagusta or Paphos. 3000 troops were stationed at Lapithos under the command of Zanetto Dandolo in the years preceding the Ottoman conquest of Cyprus in 1571. Dandolo was killed during the defence of Nicosia.

Ottoman period
In 1780 a section of Lapithos was split off to form a new village, Karavas.

British rule

Lapithos became a municipality soon after the transfer of power to the British rule, with Andreas Koumides becoming the first mayor.

Geography

Situated about 14 kilometres west of Kyrenia, on the northern coast of Cyprus, on the East it borders with Karavas, on the West with Basileia, on its south with the villages of Sysklhpos, Agridaki, and Larnaka tis Lapithou. It spreads from the high mountains of Pentadactylos to the waters of the Mediterranean. In fact, it rests against the background of the highest peak of Pentadactylos, the Kyparissovouno.

Economy

Civil servants and workers constitute the majority of the working population. Tourism, agriculture, small-scale industry and fishing are also important sources of income, practised by the rest of the population.

Agriculture 
Thanks to its spring, Lapithos has rich water resources and fertile land. This results in an agricultural sector with a diverse range of products. Citrus is a major product, the lemons of Lapithos are especially renowned. In the hills, olive and carob trees grow. Among other trees and crops cultivated are pistachio, konari and kolokas/kolokasi. Mulberry trees are also planted and provide the protection of lemon trees from the salt and winds of the sea, as well as the silk that is used in the silk industry and handicrafts. Lapithos also has a great variety of plums, including the "flokkaroues" variety unique to the town.

Politics

Turkish Cypriot municipality 
The Municipality of Lapithos (Lapta) that de facto administers the town was founded on 19 November 1974 by the cabinet of the Autonomous Turkish Cypriot Administration. The current mayor is Fuat Namsoy of the National Unity Party. He has been in this position since 1994.

Greek Cypriot municipality 
The Municipality of Lapithos was established in 1878 by the British as one of the ten new municipalities after the beginning of their rule in Cyprus. The municipality has horned Athena on its logo, in reference to an ancient coin found in Lapithos. In 1974, this municipality was forced into exile, and its municipal council operating then stayed at their positions until 1987. The municipality is currently located at 37 Ammochostou Street and shares its headquarters with the municipality-in-exile of Kythrea. The current mayor-in-exile is Neoptolemos Kotsapas.

Before 1974, the village was administratively divided into six parishes, each with its own civil and religious administration, community council, an ecclesiastical authority with a Greek Orthodox priest, and cemetery. The parishes were as follows:

 Upper Lapithos: the parishes of Ayia Anastasia and Ayia Paraskevi, collectively referred as the Pano Enories (Upper Parishes)
 Ayios Theodhoros in the west
 Timios Prodhromos in the centre
 Ayios Loukas in the centre
 Ayios Minas in the east.

In addition to these parishes, the seventh administrative division was the Turkish Cypriot quarter.

Churches and mosques

Lapithos has 14 churches, two mosques and two monasteries. These include:
 Saint Theodoros Church: The church was built in 1834. It has two white pillars with Byzantine crosses in its yard a gallery section dated to the 17th century, with well-painted doors. It is rumoured to have previously been a chapel in a cemetery, and also has an olive press.
 Saint Minas Church: Located in the east, the church was built in 1843. The church has icons of Saint Minas on a horse, it also used to have a large icon of Saint Minas from the early 18th century.
 Saint Anastasia Church and Monastery: The church is located on a position that overlooks Lapithos, where the former Lapithos Castle used to stand. It was built in the 18th century and has many religious depictions on the walls. It has a chapel dedicated to Ayia Evdokia.
 Saint Paraskevi Church: It was built next to the ruins of an old church in 1892 and housed icons from this old church until 1974, when they were looted following the invasion.
 Saint Luka Church: It was built in 1850. It has been renovated and is now used as a ballet school.
 Timios Prodromos Church: The church is in the centre of Lapithos. It was built in the 17th century in the Gothic style. The bell tower has depictions of human faces, animals and plants. The west side has a Star of David on the walls.
 Saint Evlalios Church: The church is located at the coast, to the east of the Acheiropoietos Monastery and is dedicated to Saint Evlalios, who was a bishop who once lived in Lambousa. The present-day church was built on the ruins of an early Christian church, whose remains still stand in the form of the four columns of the central arches of the present-day church. One of these columns has a Byzantine cross engraved in it. In excavations, three different layers of mosaic tiles from three different eras have been found. This indicates that the church has been renovated in the 6th, 11th and 14th–15th centuries.
 Saint Evlambios Church: To the east of the Ahkiropietos Monastery, the church was used as a pagan tomb and was later converted to a chapel in the early Christian era. The niches are characteristic of Roman tombs and traces of frescoes are present. It has no narthex, but does have an abscess.

The mosques are as follows:
 Haydar Pashazade Mehmet Bey Mosque: There is an engraving in the mosque indicating the year of 1870, this could be the date of the renovation or the construction of the mosque. It has a unique feature in terms of its architecture in Cyprus: a dome covers the prayer area and rests on an octagonal drum and a small half dome at the four corners. Due to its unique Ottoman architecture, it has been described as "one of the island's most handsome stone mosques".
 Esseyid Elhaç Mehmet Agha Mosque, also known as the Upper Lapta Mosque: It is made of hewn stone and has a rectangular structure. It was first built by the tax collector Esseyid Elhaç Mehmet Agha in 1828, but this mosque had an earthen roof and no minaret. Between 1887 and 1889, the Sayed Mehmet Agha Foundation, led by the trustee Hadji Veli Effendi, built a patio, tile roof coverings and a 25-foot minaret. In 1899, there was also a school that belonged to the same foundation. The hewn stone minaret on the mosque's eastern side was demolished in 1974 and the present-day concrete minaret was constructed in 1976.

Culture 
The town annually hosts the Lapta Tourism Festival in the first week of June. Numerous cultural and sporting activities, folk dance shows by groups from various countries and concerts take place during the festival.

Lapithos has a unique needlework with original patterns, known as the Lapta lace. The handicraft is still preserved as a product for tourists, and is made on linen fabric with the cross-stitch technique. Lapithos have also produced the culturally important walnut wood chests for Cyprus. The town also has a tradition of knife-making; its knives traditionally had handles made of goat horn and were known for the sharpness and workmanship. The town is one of the most important silk-producing centres in the island and has been historically that way. The silk is used locally and island-wide in handicrafts and for weaving.

Lapithos hosts a vibrant sports life concentrated on the sea. Water sports such as diving, windsurfing, jet-skiing, water-skiing and parasailing are popular. Horse riding and cycling are also practised. The town is the centre of several hiking trails protected by Natura 2000; these trails pass through the area's forests, ruins of ancient cities and temples, churches and historical warehouses. The town is home to the football club Lapta Türk Birliği S.K. They played in Süper Lig, the top-level division of Turkish Cypriot football in the 2014–15 season, but were relegated as they attained the last place.

Notable locals 
George of Cyprus, Byzantine geographer
Ioannis Tsangaridis, Greek general
Andreas G. Orphanides, Professor of History and Archaeology, Music Composer

International relations

Twin towns – sister cities
Lapithos is unofficially twinned with:

 Büyükçekmece, Turkey (since 2007)
 Kemer, Antalya, Turkey (since 2012)
 Karpoš, Skopje, North Macedonia (since 2015)

References

External links 
History of Lapithos by the Municipality
Parish Churches of Lapithos by the Municipality
Farming and Crops
Lapta town and its history
About Lapta Village

Municipalities in Kyrenia District
Populated places in Girne District
Populated coastal places in Cyprus
Cities in ancient Cyprus
Municipalities of Northern Cyprus